Congregation Kol Israel is a historic Modern Orthodox synagogue at 603 St. John's Place in the Crown Heights neighborhood of Brooklyn, New York.  It was built in 1928 and is a vernacular "tenement synagogue."  It is a small, two story rectangular building faced in random laid fieldstone. It was designed by Brooklyn architect Tobias Goldstone. The western side of its midblock lot overlooks the open cut of the Franklin Avenue Line of the New York City Subway.

It was listed on the National Register of Historic Places in 2009.

In 2015, "after several failed attempts to bring in new members," the board hired Rabbi Sam Reinstein to "transform his ailing Modern Orthodox synagogue into a place young people consider cool." In addition to adding monthly art shows and after-parties to its programming, 
the synagogue in 2016 hosted "the first Jewish Comic Con," which featured comics artists Isaac Goodheart of Postal (comics) and Jordan B. Gorfinkel. 

In June 2016, an eruv built to benefit the Kol Israel congregation "increased sixfold the area in which observant Jews can carry items, and, most importantly, push strollers during Shabbat," but was opposed by Hasidic Chabad neighbors who believed the neighborhood was geographically and halakhically impossible to enclose in an eruv. Chabad's Crown Heights beth din rabbinical court issued a ruling rejecting the eruv as a "devastation of the Shabbat." A few months after the eruv was repeatedly vandalized and its organizers allegedly harassed, two Chabad members were arrested and charged with criminal mischief, although the New York City Police Department had previously said that they would be charged with criminal mischief as a hate crime and criminal tampering.

References

External links
The New York Landmarks Conservancy: Conservancy Guides Historic Brooklyn Synagogues Towards State, National Register Listing

Modern Orthodox synagogues in the United States
Synagogues completed in 1928
Properties of religious function on the National Register of Historic Places in Brooklyn
Synagogues in Brooklyn
Synagogues on the National Register of Historic Places in New York City